Faraaz is a 2022 Indian Hindi-language action thriller film directed by Hansal Mehta and produced by T-Series and Benaras Media Works. The film supporting an ensemble cast has Juhi Babbar, Aamir Ali Aditya Rawal, Zahan Kapoor, Jatin Sarin, Pallak Lalwani, and six newcomers including Kapoor marking their debut. Based on actual event, it depicts the Holey Artisan Bakery, July 2016 Dhaka attack that shook Bangladesh. The film premiered at the BFI London Film Festival on 15 October 2022, and released in India on 3 February 2023.

Cast
 Juhi Babbar as Simeen, Faraaz’s mother
 Aamir Ali
 Zahan Kapoor as Faraaz Hossain
 Aditya Rawal as Nibras
 Jatin Sarin as Mobashir 
 Godaan Kumar as rajiv
 Sachin Lalwani as Rohan
 Ninaad Shaunak Bhatt as Khairul
 Harshal Pawar as Bikash
 Reshham Sahaani 
 Pallak Lalwani
 Abhirami Bose

Production
On 5 August 2021, the director Hansal Mehta revealed his action thriller film Faraaz. A joint production, with Anubhav Sinha and Bhushan Kumar depicting the Holey Artisan Bakery attack in July 2016 in Dhaka Bangladesh. Newcomers Aditya Rawal, Zahan Kapoor, Jatin Sarin, Sachin Lalwani, Ninad Bhatt, Harshal Pawar, Palak Lalwani and Reshham Sahaani were cast in the film.

The filming ended on 15 August 2021.

Release
The film premiered at the BFI London Film Festival on 15 October 2022 in 'Thrill' section. It was released in India on 3 February 2023, after Delhi High Court refused to grant stay for release in a suit filed by the mothers of two girls who died in the terrorist attack.

Controversy 
The film has been criticized for allegedly "exploiting a horrifying tragedy for profit without asking the permission of victims family." The film's director Mehta defends against those remarks by referring to a The Business Standard opinion article that emphasizes "artistic freedom" and "being a target of cancel culture."

Song

The film has two songs, "Musafir ko ghar he aana hai" written and composed by Sameer Rahat; and "Khairiyat se" written by Alok Ranjan Srivastava and Sameer Rahat.

Reception
Monika Rawal Kukreja reviewing for Hindustan Times praised the performance of ensamble writing, "some fine performances such as: Juhi Babbar Soni as Faraaz's mother is terrific, Aditya Rawal, his brutal portrayal as the brainwashed youth that leaves you in awe, Zahan Kapoor delivers a restrained performance and emotes beautifully". Kukreja praised the lyrics of the song "Musafir ko ghar he aana hai" saying, "[the] highlight of Faraaz remains the soulful, moving lyrics. written and composed by Sameer Rahat. Concluding Kukreja wrote, 'Faraaz doesn't set out to send you home with a moral lesson yet puts across its point very subtly."
Dishya Sharma of News18 rated the film 3.5 stars out of 5 and wrote, "Faraaz is a trademark Hansal Mehta film and is not for the weak-hearted. The film is bound to leave you disturbed and empty by the end of it." 
 Renuka Vyavahare writing for The Times of India rated 3.5 out of 5 and wrote, "Hansal Mehta’s acclaimed body of work is testament to his sensibility". Praising the performances of ensamble she wrote, "every new actor gives a sincere performance", she appreciated Aditya Rawal who, she said, "portrays every aspect of his character perfectly," and Zahan Kapoor for, "his balanced and effective titular role." For others Vyavahare said, "Newcomers Sachin Lalwani and Reshham Sahaani along with Juhi Babbar play their parts with conviction." Concluding, Vyavahare opined, "As a confined space hostage thriller, Faraaz is adequately gripping and impactful. It, however, isn’t as claustrophobic and gut-wrenching as a Neerja or Hotel Mumbai." Anuj Kumar writing in The Hindu praised the performances of: Juhi Babbar writing, "Juhi brings out the guts and grace of the character with a deft performance", Zahan Kapoor saying, "Zahan gets the tonality of Faraaz right" and Aditya Rawal stating, "Aditya is a revelation as Nibras." Concluding, Kumar mentioned present scenario of "religious chauvinism" and  wrote, "Faraaz is an ache that will gradually grow on the discerning." Umesh Punwani of koimoi rated the film 2/5 and said, "Faraaz is a film that shouldn't have been titled faraaz in the first place. It doesn't revolve around Faraaz, it revolves solely around the attack he lost his life in & hence, it shold've been named accordingly."

Notes

References

External links 
 
 Faraaz at Bollywood Hungama

2020s Hindi-language films
2022 action thriller films
Indian action thriller films
2020s action thriller films
Action films based on actual events
Thriller films based on actual events
Films about jihadism
Islamic terrorism in fiction
Indian films based on actual events
Films set in Dhaka
Films about terrorism in Asia